was the 34th emperor of Japan, according to the traditional order of succession.

Jomei's reign spanned the years from 629 through 641.

Traditional narrative
As emperor, his name would have been Okinagatarashihi Hironuka Sumeramikoto (息長足日広額天皇).

He was a grandson of Emperor Bidatsu, both paternally and maternally. His father was Prince Oshisakanohikohito-no-Ōe, his mother was Princess Nukate-hime, who was a younger sister of his father.

Events in Jomei's reign
He succeeded his great aunt, Empress Suiko. Suiko did not make it clear who was to succeed her after her death. Before her death, she called Tamura and Prince Shōtoku's son, Prince Yamashiro-no-Ōe, and gave some brief advice to each of them. After her death the court was divided into two factions, each supporting one of the princes for the throne. Soga no Emishi, the head of Soga clan, supported Tamura. He claimed that Empress Suiko's last words suggested her desire that Tamura succeed her to the throne. Prince Yamashiro-no-Ōe was later attacked by the Soga clan and committed suicide along with his entire family.

 629:  In the 36th year of Empress Suiko's reign (推古天皇三十六年), the empress died, and despite a dispute over who should follow her as sovereign, contemporary scholars then construed that the succession (senso) was received by a grandson of Emperor Bidatsu and a great-grandson of Emperor Kinmei.  Shortly thereafter, Emperor Jomei is said to have acceded to the throne (sokui).

Jomei's contemporary title would not have been tennō, as most historians believe this title was not introduced until the reigns of Emperor Tenmu and Empress Jitō. Rather, it was presumably Sumeramikoto (written the same way as tennō: 天皇) or Amenoshita Shiroshimesu Ōkimi (治天下大王), meaning "the great king who rules all under heaven".  Alternatively, Jomei might have been referred to as (ヤマト大王/大君) or the "Great King of Yamato".

During Emperor Jomei's reign, Soga no Emishi seized several political initiatives. After Jomei's death, the throne was passed to his wife and niece, Princess Takara and then to her younger brother, Emperor Kōtoku, before eventually being inherited by two of his sons, Emperor Tenji and Emperor Tenmu.

Emperor Jomei's reign lasted 13 years.  In the 13th year of his reign (舒明天皇十三年), he died at the age of 49.

The actual site of Jomei's grave is known.  The emperor is traditionally venerated at a memorial Shinto shrine (misasagi) located in Nara Prefecture. The Imperial Household Agency designates this location as Jomei's mausoleum.  It is formally named Osaka no uchi no misasagi.

Poetry
The Man'yōshū includes poems attributed to emperors and empresses, including "Climbing Kagu-yama and looking upon the land", which is said to have been composed by Emperor Jomei:
 
Countless are the mountains in Yamato,
 But perfect is the heavenly hill of Kagu;
When I climb it and survey my realm,
Over the wide plain the smoke-wreaths rise and rise,
Over the wide lake the gulls are on the wing;
A beautiful land it is, the land of Yamato!
 – Emperor Jomei

Consorts and children
Hi: Princess Tame (田眼皇女), Emperor Bidatsu’s daughter

Empress: Princess Takara (宝皇女) later Empress Kōgyoku, Prince Chinu's daughter (also Prince Oshisaka-no-Hikohito-no-Ōe's grand daughter and Emperor Bidatsu’s great grand daughter)
Second Son: Prince Kazuraki/Naka-no-Ōe (葛城/中大兄皇子) later Emperor Tenji
Prince Ōama (大海人皇子) later Emperor Tenmu
Princess Hashihito (間人皇女, d. 665), Empress Consort of Emperor Kōtoku

Bunin: Soga no Hote-no-iratsume (蘇我法提郎女), Soga no Umako‘s daughter
First Son: Prince Furuhito-no-Ōe (古人大兄皇子) (ca. 612–645)
Princess Nunoshiki (布敷皇女)

Court lady (Uneme): Kaya no Uneme (蚊屋采女), lower court lady from Kaya (蚊屋采女姉子)
Prince Kaya (蚊屋皇子)

Bunin: Awata no Kagushi-hime (粟田香櫛媛)
Princess Oshisaka-no-watamuki (押坂錦向皇女)

Bunin: Soga no Tetsuki-no-iratsume (蘇我手杯娘), Soga no Emishi‘s daughter
Princess Yata (箭田皇女)

Unknown:
 Prince Isobe (磯部皇子), founder of Kuge clan

Ancestry

See also

 Emperor of Japan
 List of Emperors of Japan
 Imperial cult

Notes

References
 Aston, William George. (1896).  Nihongi: Chronicles of Japan from the Earliest Times to A.D. 697. London: Kegan Paul, Trench, Trubner.  OCLC 448337491
 Brown, Delmer M. and Ichirō Ishida, eds. (1979).  Gukanshō: The Future and the Past. Berkeley: University of California Press. ;  OCLC 251325323
 Ponsonby-Fane, Richard Arthur Brabazon. (1959).  The Imperial House of Japan. Kyoto: Ponsonby Memorial Society. OCLC 194887
 Titsingh, Isaac. (1834). Nihon Ōdai Ichiran; ou,  Annales des empereurs du Japon.  Paris: Royal Asiatic Society, Oriental Translation Fund of Great Britain and Ireland.  OCLC 5850691
 Varley, H. Paul. (1980).  Jinnō Shōtōki: A Chronicle of Gods and Sovereigns. New York: Columbia University Press. ;  OCLC 59145842
  Yamada, Munemutsu. (1992).  Nihon Shoki. Tokyo: Newton Press (Nyūton-puresu). ; OCLC 166448992

Japanese emperors
593 births
641 deaths
People of Asuka-period Japan
7th-century monarchs in Asia
6th-century Japanese people
7th-century Japanese monarchs
Man'yō poets